Joseph Graham Crothers (born 8 April 1949 in Belfast, Northern Ireland) is a former Irish cricketer. A right-handed batsman, he played twice for the Ireland cricket team in 1972, against Scotland and Wales. The match against Scotland had first-class status.

References

1949 births
Living people
Irish cricketers
Cricketers from Belfast
Cricketers from Northern Ireland